Philip Athans (born 1964 in Rochester, New York) is an American editor and author.

Biography
Philip Athans was born in 1964 in Rochester, New York, but was raised in Chicago. Athans grew up reading Marvel comics and Starlog magazines, and watching Star Trek. He graduated from film school in 1985 and started small circulation literary magazine called Alternative Fiction & Poetry.

Although Athans used to work in a record store while working on his writing career in his spare time, he was taken on in the book publishing department of TSR in 1995 when J. Robert King resigned from his full-time position as editor, and Athans stayed on through the 1997 transition to Wizards of the Coast. Athans became Managing Editor for Wizards of the Coast Book Publishing, where he spent most of his time as the Forgotten Realms novel line editor. There he edited dozens of anthologies and novels, and continued to write his own, and helped launch the Greyhawk, Dark Matter, Star*Drive, and Dungeons & Dragons novel lines. He wrote a number of Forgotten Realms books such as Lies of the Light in 2006 and Realms of War in 2008. He is well known for writing the novelizations of the computer games, Baldur's Gate and Baldur's Gate II: Shadows of Amn. His most recent works are the three novels in the Watercourse Trilogy.

Partial bibliography

Forgotten Realms: Baldur's Gate series
 Baldur's Gate (1999)
 Baldur's Gate 2: The Shadows of Amn (2000)

Forgotten Realms: War of the Spider Queen series
 Annihilation (2004)

Forgotten Realms: The Watercourse Trilogy
 Whisper of Waves (2005)
 Lies of Light (2006)
 Scream of Stone (2007)

Other novels
 The Savage Caves (under the pseudonym T.H. Lain) (2002)
 The Halls of Stormweather (Gateway to Sembia) (2007)

References

External links
 Biography at Wizards of the Coast
 

1964 births
20th-century American male writers
20th-century American novelists
21st-century American male writers
21st-century American novelists
American book editors
American fantasy writers
American male novelists
Living people
Novelists from New York (state)
Writers from Rochester, New York